Monguzzo is a comune (municipality) in the Province of Como in the Italian region Lombardy, located about  north of Milan and about  southeast of Como.

Monguzzo borders the following municipalities: Albavilla, Alserio, Anzano del Parco, Erba, Lurago d'Erba, Merone.

References

Cities and towns in Lombardy